Terpeikiai is a village in Panevėžys County, in northeastern Lithuania. According to the 2011 census, the village has a population of 48 people.

Geography 
Village situated on the right bank of river Lėvuo.

Demography

Notable residents 
 Virgilijus Alekna (born 1972), Olympic discus throw champions, member of parliament Seimas;
 Kajetonas Aleknavičius (1804–1874), poet and writer.

References

Villages in Panevėžys County
Kupiškis District Municipality